Puyo may refer to;

 Puyo, Pastaza, the capital of Pastaza, a province in Ecuador
 Buyeo (state), or Puyo, an ancient Korean kingdom
 Buyeo County, in South Korea
 Puyo (manga artist), a Japanese manga artist
 Puyo Pop/Puyo Puyo, a Japanese video game series
 Puyo, Su-ngai Kolok - Narathiwat Province, Thailand
 Apostolic Vicariate of Puyo, of the Roman Catholic Church, in Ecuador